Offramp is the third album by the Pat Metheny Group, released in 1982. It won the Grammy Award for Best Jazz Fusion Performance. It contains the popular ballad "Are You Going with Me?".

Offramp is the first studio album on which Metheny used a guitar synthesizer, a Roland GR-300 controlled with a Roland G-303 guitar synthesiser controller.  The guitar synthesizer became one of Metheny's most frequently used instruments.

Offramp is also the first Group album to feature vocals, which became a fundamental component of the band's sound. When Metheny and Lyle Mays partnered with Brazilian percussionist Naná Vasconcelos on the album As Falls Wichita, So Falls Wichita Falls, they sought to expand the potential of the recording studio as an ensemble instrument and experiment with sounds they hadn't previously utilized. Some of the innovations introduced on Wichita carried over into Offramp, namely Vasconcelos's vocals and percussion stylings.

Bassist Mark Egan was replaced by Steve Rodby, who remained with the Group well into the 2000s and became an important partner in the compositional and production processes between Metheny and Mays.

The Group pays tribute to one of Metheny's biggest influences, pioneering free jazz instrumentalist Ornette Coleman, on the title track, and singer-songwriter James Taylor served as the inspiration for the sixth track, "James."

Reception 
Offramp was critically acclaimed and commercially successful at the time of its release.  It won the Playboy Readers Poll for Best Jazz Album and the 1982 Grammy Award for Best Jazz Fusion Performance, the Group's first of ten Grammys.

The album continues to be acclaimed by critics and fans of the Group for its compositional maturity, technological progressiveness, especially for the time it was recorded, and for introducing key hallmarks of the Group's overall sound, namely the guitar synthesizer and vocals.

It was voted number 669 in the third edition of Colin Larkin's All Time Top 1000 Albums (2000).

Track listing 

Note
A composition entitled "The Bat" appeared on Metheny's collaborative jazz album 80/81, in 1980. "The Bat Part II" is a reworking of that song.

Personnel 
 Pat Metheny – electric and acoustic guitar, guitar synthesizer, Synclavier
 Lyle Mays – piano, synthesizers, autoharp, electric organ, Synclavier
 Steve Rodby – electric and acoustic bass
 Danny Gottlieb – drums
 Naná Vasconcelos – percussion, voice, berimbau

Charts

Awards
Grammy Awards

References

Pat Metheny albums
1982 albums
ECM Records albums
Albums produced by Manfred Eicher
Grammy Award for Best Jazz Fusion Performance